Adam Jake Taggart (born 2 June 1993) is an Australian footballer who plays for Perth Glory in the A-League Men competition. Taggart has also represented the Australia national U20 team, Australia national U23 team and Australia national team. Taggart is a striker and is a former holder of the Nike A-League Golden Boot award, scoring 16 goals in 25 appearances for the Jets during the 2013–14 A-League season.

Club career

Perth Glory
Taggart made his senior debut in a 1–1 draw with Melbourne Heart in January 2011. He scored his first goal in a loss to Gold Coast United, 75 minutes into the game.

Newcastle Jets
On 2 March 2012, Taggart signed a two-year contract with A-League club Newcastle Jets. In November 2013, Taggart scored a hat trick against Melbourne Heart with all three goals scored from outside the 18 yard box. Newcastle would go on and win the match. After a strong start to the season, Adam had a dry patch with a lack of goals around Christmas, before scoring a brace against the Wanderers to salvage a 2–2 draw. He became a focal point of the Newcastle Jets attack, heading the lineup alongside Emile Heskey, Joel Griffiths and Michael Bridges. In 2014, Taggart became the second Newcastle player to receive the golden boot of the A-League with 16 goals, after Joel Griffiths in 2008. He was also awarded the A-League Young Player of the Season Award at the same ceremony.

Fulham
On 24 June 2014, Fulham signed Taggart from Newcastle Jets for an undisclosed fee on a three-year contract but injury delayed his involvement with the first team by a number of months.

Loan to Dundee United
On 1 September 2015, Taggart signed for Scottish Premiership club Dundee United on a loan deal until January 2016.

Perth Glory
On 26 January 2016, Taggart signed for Perth Glory again on a permanent deal. However, he was ineligible to play for Perth in the 2015–16 A-League under FIFA regulations preventing players from registering for more than two clubs in a single season. In the first game of the 2016–17 season, Taggart started in the number 11 role, scoring twice in the first half. After leading at half time 3–0, the Glory squandered the lead and the final result was a 3–3 draw.

Brisbane Roar
On 1 May 2018, Brisbane Roar announced the signing of Taggart as his contract at Perth Glory ended. He signed a contract with Brisbane contracting his services to them for the next two years. On 14 February 2019, Brisbane Roar announced Taggart had come to terms with an Asian club for his transfer.

Suwon Samsung Bluewings
On 18 February 2019, Taggart was sold to Suwon Samsung Bluewings for $150,000. Taggart made his debut on 1 March 2019 in a 2–1 defeat against Ulsan Hyundai where he came on as a substitute at half time scoring in the 63' minute. On 14 August 2019, he was named K-League Player of the Month for July. Taggart was almost unplayable in July, scoring seven goals in just six league appearances to shoot to the top of the K-League scoring charts. On 17 August 2019, he scored his first K-League hat trick against Gangwon FC.

He would finish the 2019 K-League 1 season as top goal scorer in his debut season.

Cerezo Osaka 
On 20 December 2020, Taggart was transferred to Cerezo Osaka.

Return to Perth 
On 15 December 2022, Perth Glory announced that Taggart would be returning to the club on a three-and-a-half year deal.

International career

Taggart made his debut for Australia in late 2012, in the second preliminary round of the 2013 EAFF East Asian Cup against Hong Kong, coming off the bench in a narrow win. He scored his first two international goals days later in a win over Chinese Taipei.

In 2013, Taggart played in the 2013 EAFF East Asian Cup, scoring a goal in a loss to China.

Taggart was a part of the Socceroos squad for the 2014 FIFA World Cup, and played in matches against Netherlands and Spain.

Career statistics

Club

International

Scores and results list Australia's goal tally first.

Honours

Individual
A-League Golden Boot: 2013–14
A-League Young Player of the Year: 2013–14
PFA A-League Team of the Season: 2013–14
K League 1 Top scorer: 2019
K League 1 Best XI: 2019

Club
 Suwon Samsung Bluewings
 KFA Cup: 2019

References

External links
 Aussie Footballers Tabain to Tathem 

	

1993 births
Living people
Soccer players from Perth, Western Australia
Australian soccer players
Australia youth international soccer players
Australia under-20 international soccer players
Australia international soccer players
Australian expatriate sportspeople in England
Newcastle Jets FC players
A-League Men players
Perth Glory FC players
Brisbane Roar FC players
Fulham F.C. players
Dundee United F.C. players
Suwon Samsung Bluewings players
Cerezo Osaka players
Australian Institute of Sport soccer players
2014 FIFA World Cup players
Scottish Professional Football League players
Australian expatriate soccer players
Expatriate footballers in England
Expatriate footballers in Scotland
Expatriate footballers in Japan
Expatriate footballers in South Korea
Association football forwards